Mudiaga Odje (25 September 1923 – 9 December 2005) was a Nigerian attorney. He was born in Evwreni.

He helped shape both the constitutional and legal systems of the Federal Republic of Nigeria. He was the lead counsel in the first successful impeachment of a sitting governor in Nigeria. He was also one of the only lawyers to have persuaded the Supreme Court of Nigeria to overrule itself on a previous decision.

Role in constitution drafting 
Odje participated in the drafting of the Constitution between 1966 and 1977, when he was a member of the Ad Hoc Constitutional Conference in Lagos, as well as in the Constituent Assembly.

Law career 
Admitted into the Inner Temple of the English Bar on 5 February 1960, Odje went on to obtain his LLM as well as PhD in Law from the University of London in 1965.

As a prosecutor, Odje was the lead counsel during the Hon. Begho Tribunal that probed assets of former public officers of the Midwestern region of Nigeria in 1966. Odje was also chairman of the Odje Commission of Inquiry, Bendel State, Nigeria from 1975 to 1976 that probed assets of the former public officers of Bendel State. Both Tribunals resulted in the convictions of public officers and confiscation of assets acquired through corrupt practices.

As an Attorney, Odje was President of the Nigeria Bar Association (NBA) from 1974 to 1976. He would later become a Fellow of the International Academy of Trial Lawyers F.I.A.T.L (USA) in December 1976.

On 12 January 1978, Odje became the first Senior Advocate of Nigeria of Urhobo extraction in Delta State of Nigeria. He was subsequently elected to represent Ughelli and Isoko Local Governments in the Nigeria National Constituent Assembly in 1979.

Odje’s Phd Thesis on the "Law of Succession in Southern Nigeria with special reference to the Midwestern Region" (London in 1965) remains a veritable source of academic and legal rallying point till date.

In that request, Odje handled very contentious cases up to the Supreme Court on the Law of Succession under Urhobo, Itsekiri and Benin Native Laws and Customs.  Some of these cases include:
 
(i)         Thompson Oke & Anor V Robinson Oke and Anor (1974) 1 ALL NLR 443  
 
(ii)        Idehen V Idehen (1991) 6 NWLR (pt 198) 382
 
(iii)       Agidigbi V Agidigbi (1996) 6 NWLR (pt 454) 300

Landmark cases 
In his legal career Odje handled many cases that sharpened the Constitutional and Legal Systems of Nigeria. He was the lead Counsel in the case wherein the first impeachment of a sitting Governor in Nigerian Legal History, Alhaji Balarabe Musa of Kaduna State was successfully conducted and upheld by the Court (Alhaji Balarabe Musa V Auta Hamza and 6ors 1982 3NCLR 229). Odje was also included in the significant constitutional precedent that validated the elections of President Shehu Shagari by the Supreme Court of Nigeria in 1979 in the case of Chief Obafemi Awolowo V Alhaji Shehu Shagari 1979 ALL NLR 120
In the spirit of protecting the Ethnic Nationalities of Nigeria, and their natural resources, Odje successfully protected the riparian rights of fishermen from  expropriation by the Federal Government of Nigeria in the case of Elf V Sillo (1994) 6 NWLR (Pt356) 258. On constitutional law, and the right of freedom of movement in Nigeria, Dr. Odje handled the locus classicus of Federal Ministry of Internal Affairs V Shugaba (1982) NCLR 915.

Indeed, Odje was one of the only and foremost lawyers to successfully and instructively too, persuade the Supreme Court of Nigeria to overrule itself on its previous decision and accept his contention as the new and correct position of the Law. This legal accomplishment has been reported in the cases of Esewe V Gbe (1988) 5 NWLR (Pt 93) 134 which was overruled in Orubu V National Electoral Commission & 13 Ors (1988) 5 NWLR (Pt94) 323.
Dr. Odje also handled many other landmark cases that augmented the Nigerian Legal System including the presentations of several thought-provoking lectures he delivered to both professional and non professional bodies.

National honours 
In October 1982, Odje was conferred with the National Honour of Officer of the Federal Republic of Nigeria (OFR) by President Shehu Shagari. Odje was also a Fellow of the Institute of Advanced Legal Studies, Abuja (FIALS).  Odje is an Olorogun from his Ewvreni Kingdom in Ughelli North Local Government as well as an Okakyro of Okpe Kingdom, all in Delta State Nigeria.

Odje became a member of the Body of Benchers and a LIFE Bencher on 30 March 1989. Odje was also chairman of numerous bodies and committees  including;

Chairman - Honorable BODY OF BENCHERS from 1996 - 1997.

Chairman - Federal Government Commission for in-depth study of the Nigeria/Benin Republic boundary dispute, including the maritime sector from 1989 and 1990.

Chairman - Delta State Committee on Review of Civil Procedure 2004.

Chairman - Delta State Legal Team/Committee on the Resource Control Case at the Supreme Court now reported as AG of Fed VAG Abia 2002 6 NWLR (pt 764) 54

In addition, to the above, Odje was a member and vice Chairman of the Human Rights Violation Investigation Commission, known as the Oputa Panel. The Panel was established through the Statutory Instrument 8 of June 1999 by erstwhile President Olusegun Obasanjo pursuant to the Tribunals of Inquiry Act of 1966 to investigate incidents of Traditional Justice Institutions and Organizations as well as gross violations of Human Rights committed in Nigeria between 15 January 1966, the day when a military coup instituted military control over the country, and 29 May 1999, when Obasanjo hitherto became President.

References

External links
http://supremecourt.gov.ng/Profile/SAN
http://waado.org/NigerDelta/Memorials/odje_mudiaga.htm
http://www.waado.org/biographies/Memorials/odje_mudiaga/odje_mudiaga.htm
http://allafrica.com/stories/200512200470.html
https://books.google.com/books?id=fFdeYB1lIPwC&pg=PA676&lpg=PA676&dq=dr+mudiaga+odje&source=bl&ots=L6SwFf0XPP&sig=DI50RD37TTRej6834mug_tUu7zY&hl=en&sa=X&ved=0ahUKEwi1hbO14NLKAhUN1WMKHfQyAnAQ6AEITzAI#v=onepage&q=dr%20mudiaga%20odje&f=false
http://glitteratiinternational.com/site/photo_gallery.php?page=image-detail&edition=11&album=12&image=57

1923 births
2005 deaths
20th-century Nigerian lawyers
Nigerian expatriates in the United Kingdom